Henderson County Courthouse can refer to:

 Henderson County Courthouse (North Carolina), Hendersonville, North Carolina
 Henderson County Courthouse (Texas), Athens, Texas